Mamlah-ye Olya (also Romanized as Mamlaḥ-ye ‘Olyā and Mamlah-ye ‘Olyā) is a village in Gharb-e Karun Rural District, in the Central District of Khorramshahr County, Khuzestan Province, Iran. At the 2006 census, its population was 60, in 11 families.

References 

Populated places in Khorramshahr County